Ingo Wellenreuther (born 16 December 1959) is a German politician of the Christian Democratic Union (CDU) who served as a member of the Bundestag from 2002 to 2021.

Early career
From 1991 until 2000, Wellenreuther was a judge at the Karlsruhe Regional Court. He later worked as advisor to the CDU/CSU parliamentary group in the German Parliament from 2000 until 2001.

Political career
Wellenreuther first became a member of the German Bundestag in the 2002 federal elections.

From 2005 until 2009, Wellenreuther served on the Committee on Internal Affairs. From 2009, he was a member of the Committee on Legal Affairs and Consumer Protection. Also from 2009, he served on the parliamentary body in charge of appointing judges to the Highest Courts of Justice, namely the Federal Court of Justice (BGH), the Federal Administrative Court (BVerwG), the Federal Fiscal Court (BFH), the Federal Labour Court (BAG), and the Federal Social Court (BSG).

Ahead of the Christian Democrats’ leadership election in 2021, Wellenreuther publicly endorsed Friedrich Merz to succeed Annegret Kramp-Karrenbauer as the party's chair.

He lost his seat to Zoe Mayer of the Alliance 90/The Greens in the 2021 German federal election.

Other activities
 Karlsruher SC, President (2010-2020)
 Federal Agency for Civic Education, Member of the Board of Trustees (since 2007)
 German Football Association (DFB), Member of the Board (2013-2017)
 Foundation Remembrance, Responsibility and Future, Member of the Board of Trustees (2006-2011)
 Internationaler Bund, Member of the Board of Trustees (2002-2017)

Personal life
Wellenreuther is married. He is the father of Feyenoord's goalkeeper Timon Wellenreuther.

References

External links
Official website 

1959 births
20th-century German judges
German Protestants
Heidelberg University alumni
Karlsruher SC
Living people
Members of the Bundestag for Baden-Württemberg
Politicians from Karlsruhe
University of Giessen alumni
Members of the Bundestag 2013–2017
Members of the Bundestag 2017–2021
Members of the Bundestag 2009–2013
Members of the Bundestag 2005–2009
Members of the Bundestag 2002–2005
Members of the Bundestag for the Christian Democratic Union of Germany